Jamel Shabazz (born 1960) is an African-American fashion, fine art, documentary and street style photographer. His work has been published in books, shown in exhibitions, and used in editorial magazine works. He was born in Brooklyn, New York.

Jamel Shabazz centered his work on minority people and areas of America during a very turbulent time in the country. He was a pioneer in creating awareness of the livelihoods of African-American and minority people int the dense New York City area. Jamel Shabazz was a master at using what is at his disposal to his advantage to create a realistic scene of being part of the black community in that time period and location. His works of art were created to express the joys and happiness that come along with growing up in the city. Jamel paints the minority poor class that lives therein a familiar and playful light that goes against many negative stereotypes people had at the time.

One of his more famous works is his photograph A Time of Innocence, taken in 1981 in Brooklyn, New York.This photograph depicted a group of young African American children playing and riding in a shopping cart in the midst of the chaotic street. This photograph caught a glimpse of the lives of the young black youth population and helped others see the bonds and community that they share.

Career  
His book Back in the Days (2002) collects Shabazz's street style photographs made in New York City between 1980 and 1989, which documents the emerging hip-hop culture. The Last Sunday in June (2003) collects ten years of photographs of gay pride events in New York City. Sights in the City: New York Street Photographs (2017) contains work from four decades of photographing people in the city. City Metro (2020) contains photographs made between 1980 and 2018 of people on the New York City Subway.

Shabazz's photographs have appeared in the 2007 documentary film Planet B-Boy, the 2008 exhibition Street Art Street Life: From the 1950s to Now in the Bronx Museum of the Arts, and as the album cover art for the 2011 hip hop album Undun by The Roots. Shabazz appeared in the Cheryl Dunn 2010 documentary Everybody Street, "about photographers who have used New York City street life as a major subject in their work".

In an interview with Nation19 magazine, Jamel said he used both analog film and digital photography.

In 2016 Shabazz was portrayed by Cedric Benjamin in the second episode of Luke Cage. A fictionalized version of Shabazz appears in a flashback where he meets street thug Pop and his companions Cornell Stokes and Fredo Diaz, and asked them to pose for a picture, which they agreed to. In the following years, Pop kept a copy of the photo with him.

Publications
Back in the Days. Brooklyn: powerHouse, 2002. .
The Last Sunday in June. Brooklyn: powerHouse, 2003. .
A Time Before Crack. Brooklyn: powerHouse, 2005. .
Seconds of My Life. Brooklyn: powerHouse, 2007. .
Sights in the City: New York Street Photographs. Damiani, 2017. .
Back in the Days: Remix. Brooklyn: powerHouse, 2017. .
City Metro (2020)

References

External links
 
 
 "City Metro by Jamel Shabazz", photographs at Another Magazine
 Bronx Museum exhibit

Living people
1960 births
21st-century African-American people
20th-century African-American people
People from Brooklyn
Photographers from New York (state)
African-American photographers
Street photographers